Steve or Stephen McDonald may refer to:

Steve McDonald (Celtic music) (born 1950), Celtic music artist
Steve McDonald (Coronation Street), a fictional character on the soap opera Coronation Street
Steve McDonald (cricketer) (born 1974), English cricketer
Steve Macdonald (filk musician) (born 1961), American filk musician
Steve MacDonald (soccer), Canadian soccer player
Steve MacDonald (strongman) (born 1969), professional strongman competitor
Stephen McDonald (footballer) (1884–1964), Scottish footballer
Stephen W. McDonald, astronomer

See also
Steve MacDonald (1971–2002), Canadian drummer with Gorguts
Stephen A. MacDonald (born 1946), American software executive
Stephen MacDonald (1933–2009), English actor
Steven Edward McDonald (born 1956), American writer
Steven Shane McDonald (born 1967), bass player
Steven McDonald (1957–2017), New York City Police Department detective